Sanger is a ghost town in Baker County, Oregon, United States. Originally founded as Augusta in 1871, the town changed its name to Sanger in 1877.

References

Former populated places in Baker County, Oregon
Ghost towns in Oregon
Populated places established in 1886
1871 establishments in Oregon
Populated places established in 1871